St. Petersburg, Florida, held an election for mayor on September 1 and November 3, 2009. A non-partisan primary election was first held on September 1. No candidate won a majority of the vote, so the top two finisher advanced to a runoff. It saw the election of Bill Foster.

Results

Primary

Runoff

References

2009
Mayoral election, 2000
2009 Florida elections
St. Petersburg